Mabel Mary Spanton  (1 December 1874 — ca. 1940) was a British landscape painter who primarily worked in watercolour.

Life and work
Mabel Mary Spanton was born in Hanley, Staffordshire on 1 December 1874, the daughter of Dr. William Dunnet Spanton, F.R.C.S. She studied art at Hanley School of Art under J. S. Cartlidge, and also in Newlyn, Cornwall under Stanhope Forbes, R.A.

Spanton was elected as a member of the prestigious Royal Watercolour Society in 1927. She travelled and painted extensively across the Continent including the Balearic Islands in 1925, Italy, Spain, the Netherlands and Belgium in 1928, and in England and Scotland in 1938. During the early 1920s Spanton lived in both Hastings and Bexhill, Sussex before spending the majority of her later years abroad.

Exhibitions
She exhibited extensively including in London at the Royal Academy; London Salon; Royal Society of British Artists; Society of Women Artists; Royal Institute of Painters in Watercolours; Women's International Art Club; Dudley Gallery and New Dudley Gallery; Goupil Gallery; Walker Gallery. Elsewhere her work was exhibited at the Royal Scottish Academy; Royal Hibernian Academy; Royal Cambrian Academy; Royal Scottish Society of Painters in Watercolours; Glasgow Institute of the Fine Arts; Abbey Gallery, Stoke-on-Trent; Royal Society of Artists Birmingham; Walker Art Gallery Liverpool; and at Bristol, Derby, Oldham, Hull, Newlyn, Southport, and Aberdeen.

References

1874 births
1940s deaths
Year of death uncertain
20th-century English painters
20th-century English women artists
English women painters
English watercolourists
English landscape painters
People from Hanley, Staffordshire
People from Bexhill-on-Sea
People from Hastings
Women watercolorists